14 Days, 12 Nights is a Canadian drama film, directed by Jean-Philippe Duval and released in 2019. The film stars Anne Dorval as Isabelle Brodeur, a Canadian woman whose grief over the accidental death of her adopted Vietnamese-born teenage daughter leads her to undertake a trip to Vietnam to meet Thuy Nguyen (Leanna Chea), the girl's birth mother.

Release
The film premiered at the Abitibi-Témiscamingue International Film Festival in October 2019, and had its commercial premiere in February 2020.

Accolades
14 Days, 12 Nights was selected as the Canadian entry for the Best International Feature Film at the 93rd Academy Awards, after Canada's initial submission, Funny Boy was disqualified. It was not nominated.

See also
 List of submissions to the 93rd Academy Awards for Best International Feature Film
 List of Canadian submissions for the Academy Award for Best International Feature Film

References

External links

2019 films
Canadian drama films
Films set in Vietnam
Quebec films
2019 drama films
Films directed by Jean-Philippe Duval
2010s French-language films
Films about Vietnamese Canadians
French-language Canadian films
2010s Canadian films